Fernando Di Giulio (27 April 1924 – 28 August 1981) was an Italian politician who served as a Deputy for three legislatures from 1972 to 1981. He also served as the leader of the Italian Communist Party in the Chamber of Deputies (1979–1981).

References

1924 births
1981 deaths
Deputies of Legislature VI of Italy
Deputies of Legislature VII of Italy
Deputies of Legislature VIII of Italy
Italian Communist Party politicians
Politicians from Grosseto